Grace Lutheran Church is a historic Evangelical Lutheran Church in America church at 1124 N. 3rd Street in Phoenix, Arizona, United States.

It was built in 1928, in the Gothic Revival style.  The congregation itself has been in existence since 1914, making it the oldest Lutheran church in Arizona.

It was added to the National Register of Historic Places in 1993.

References

External links

Churches in Phoenix, Arizona
Phoenix GraceChurch
National Register of Historic Places in Phoenix, Arizona
Phoenix GraceChurch
Phoenix GraceChurch
Phoenix GraceChurch